Esperan Rural District is in the Central District of Tabriz County, East Azerbaijan province, Iran. At the National Census of 2006, its population was 8,403 in 2,152 households. There were 12,939 inhabitants in 3,594 households at the following census of 2011. At the most recent census of 2016, the population of the rural district was 14,393 in 4,278 households. The largest of its 19 villages was Ana Khatun, with 8,288 people.

References 

Tabriz County

Rural Districts of East Azerbaijan Province

Populated places in East Azerbaijan Province

Populated places in Tabriz County